These are U.S. towns and villages flooded by the creation of dams, destroyed by the advancing sea, or washed away in floods and never rebuilt.

Alabama 
Kowaliga, submerged under Lake Martin

Arkansas
Monte Ne, submerged under Beaver Lake
Napoleon, washed away by the Mississippi River
Kingdon Springs, flooded by Bull Shoals Lake.

California
 Bagby, under Lake McClure
 Baird, under Lake Shasta
 Bidwell's Bar, under Lake Oroville
 Camanche, under Camanche Reservoir
 Cedar Springs, under Silverwood Lake
 Copper City, under Lake Shasta
 Crystal Springs, under Crystal Springs Reservoir
 Elmore, under Lake Shasta
 Etter, under Lake Shasta
 Jacksonville, under Don Pedro Reservoir
 Kennett, under Lake Shasta
 Melones, under New Melones Lake
 Monticello, under Lake Berryessa
 Morley, under Lake Shasta
 Mormon Island, under Folsom Lake
 Old Isabella, under Lake Isabella
 Old Kernville, under Lake Isabella
 Pitt, under Lake Shasta
 Poverty Bar, under Camanche Reservoir
 Prattville, under Lake Almanor
 Salmon Falls, under Folsom Lake
 Searsville, under Searsville Lake
 Whiskeytown, under Whiskeytown Lake
 Winthrop, under Lake Shasta

Colorado
 Sopris, flooded by the creation of Trinidad Lake State Park Reservoir
 Dillon , under Dillon Reservoir
 Stout, Flooded by the creation of Horsetooth Reservoir

Connecticut
 Barkhamstad Hollow, under Barkhamsted Reservoir
  Jerusalem, under Candlewood Lake

Georgia

 Oscarville, under Lake Lanier

Etowah and Allatoona under Allatoona Lake
Petersburg, under Lake Strom Thurmond (also known as Clark Hills Lake).

Indiana
 Fairfield, under Brookville Lake
 Somerset, under Mississinewa Lake

Kentucky
 Eddyville, Kentucky, flooded by the creation of Lake Barkley
 Kuttawa, Kentucky, flooded by the creation of Lake Barkley
 Birmingham, Kentucky, flooded by the creation of Kentucky Lake
 Burnside, Kentucky flooded by the creation of Lake Cumberland

Maine
Flagstaff, under Flagstaff Lake

Maryland
 Conowingo, flooded by the creation of Conowingo Reservoir and relocated
 Warren, flooded by the creation of Loch Raven Reservoir

Massachusetts
 Dana, under Quabbin Reservoir
 Enfield, under Quabbin Reservoir
 Greenwich, under Quabbin Reservoir
 Prescott, partially under Quabbin Reservoir

Michigan
 Rawsonville, under Belleville Lake

Missouri 

 Linn Creek, Missouri

Mississippi
Ben Lomond, Mississippi
Coldwater, flooded by Arkabutla Lake and relocated
New Mexico, Mississippi
 Port Anderson, Mississippi
Prentiss, Bolivar County, Mississippi

Montana
 Canton, under Canyon Ferry Lake

Nevada
 St. Thomas, under Lake Mead

New York
 Arena, flooded by Pepacton Reservoir
 Boiceville, flooded by Ashokan Reservoir
 Brown's Station, flooded by Ashokan Reservoir
 Cannonsville, flooded by Cannonsville Reservoir
 Elko, flooded by Allegheny Reservoir
 Gilboa, flooded by Schoharie Reservoir and relocated
 Glenford, flooded by Ashokan Reservoir and relocated
 Kensico, flooded by Kensico Reservoir
 Neversink, flooded by Neversink Reservoir and relocated
 Olive, flooded by Ashokan Reservoir
 Olive Bridge, flooded by Ashokan Reservoir and relocated
 Pepacton, flooded by Pepacton Reservoir
 Shavertown, flooded by Pepacton Reservoir
 Shokan, flooded by Ashokan Reservoir
 Stony Hollow, flooded by Ashokan Reservoir
 West Hurley, flooded by Ashokan Reservoir and relocated
 West Shokan, flooded by Ashokan Reservoir

North Carolina
 Judson, flooded by Fontana Lake
 Proctor, flooded by Fontana Lake
Long Island, flooded by Lake Norman
East Monbo, flooded by Lake Norman.
Fonta Flora, flooded by Lake James.

New Jersey
  Round Valley, under Round Valley Reservoir

Oregon
 Arlington, flooded by Lake Umatilla but relocated
 Bayocean, destroyed by erosion into the Pacific Ocean
 Blalock, inundated by the backwaters from the John Day Dam
 Celilo, flooded by Lake Celilo
 Champoeg, destroyed by the Great Flood of 1862
 Copper, under Applegate Reservoir
 Detroit, inundated by Detroit Lake and relocated
 Dorena, flooded by Dorena Reservoir and relocated
 Homestead, possibly under the Hells Canyon Reservoir
 Linn City, destroyed by the Great Flood of 1862
 Orleans, destroyed by the Great Flood of 1862
 Robinette, under Brownlee Reservoir
 Vanport, destroyed by the flooding of the Columbia River

Pennsylvania
 Aitch, submerged to form Raystown Lake.
 Big Creek Valley, Submerged to form Beltzville Lake.
 Cokeville, under the waters of Conemaugh River Lake.
 Corydon, flooded by Allegheny Reservoir
 Fillmore, under the waters of Conemaugh River Lake.
 Instanter, under the waters of East Branch Lake.
 Kinzua, flooded by Allegheny Reservoir
 Livermore, flooded by the Conemaugh Dam
 Marburg, under Lake Marburg.
 Milford Mills, flooded by creation of Marsh Creek Lake
 Social Hall, under the waters of Conemaugh River Lake.
 Somerfield, under the waters of Youghiogheny River Lake.
 Straight, under the waters of East Branch Lake.
 Tohickon, flooded by the creation of Lake Nockamixon
 Wilsonville, flooded to create Lake Wallenpaupack

Rhode Island
 Scituate, partially flooded by Scituate Reservoir

South Carolina
 Dutch Fork and Saxe Gotha, under Lake Murray
Ferguson, flooded by Lake Marion
 Andersonville, flooded by Lake Hartwell

Tennessee
 Awalt, flooded by Tims Ford Lake.
 Butler, flooded by Watauga Lake.
 Loyston, flooded by Norris Lake.
 Willow Grove, flooded by Dale Hollow Lake.
 Morganton, flooded by Tellico Dam.
 Tuskegee, flooded by Tellico Dam.

Texas 

 Aiken, under Belton Lake 
 Bland, under Belton Lake 
 Bluffton, under Lake Buchanan
 Brookhaven, under Belton Lake 
 Devils River, under Lake Amistad
 Friendship, under Granger Lake
 Halsell, under Lake Arrowhead
 Preston, under Lake Texoma
 Sparta, under Belton Lake 
 Towash, under Lake Whitney
 Canyon City, under Canyon Lake, Canyon Lake, Texas

Utah
 Adventure, destroyed by the Great Flood of 1862
 Connellsville, flooded by Electric Lake
 Hailstone, flooded by Jordanelle Reservoir
 Keetley, flooded by Jordanelle Reservoir
 Linwood, flooded by Flaming Gorge Reservoir
 Rockport, flooded by Rockport Reservoir

Washington
 Kosmos, flooded by the Mossyrock Dam
 Mayfield flooded by the Mayfield Dam
 Nesika, flooded by the Mossyrock Dam
 Riffe, flooded by the Mossyrock Dam
 Vantage, flooded by the Wanapum Dam

See also 

 Lists of ghost towns in the United States

References

External links
 Inundated Underwater Cities
 Ashokan Communities

Former populated places in the United States
Floods in the United States
Dams in the United States